KOFH (99.1 FM) is an American radio station broadcasting a Spanish Contemporary format. It is licensed to Nogales, Arizona.  The station is currently owned by Felix Corporation.

External links
 
 
 

Radio stations established in 1972
OFH
OFH
Nogales, Arizona